is a Japanese film director.

Filmography

Yuriko's Aroma (2010)
Ochiki (2012)
Usotsuki Paradox (2013)
Onna no Ana (2014)
The Torture Club (2014)
Sukimasuki (2015)
Sexual Drive (2022)

References

External links

Japanese film directors
Living people
Place of birth missing (living people)
Year of birth missing (living people)